Rashtian (also Romanized as Rashtīān and Rashteyān; also known as Rashian) is a village in Fash Rural District, in the Central District of Kangavar County, Kermanshah Province, Iran. At the 2006 census, its population was 193, in 47 families.

References 

Populated places in Kangavar County